Harry Eden (born 1 March 1990) is an English actor who won a British Independent Film Award in 2003 for Most Promising Newcomer for his role in Pure.

Eden was born in Old Harlow, Essex. He attended the Sylvia Young Theatre School. He played Nibs in the 2003 film Peter Pan, and the Artful Dodger in Roman Polanski's Oliver Twist. He was inspired by Lionel Bart's Oliver! and the role of the Artful Dodger. He said that he prefers acting in a challenging role and that he would not like to be Harry Potter, even though he loves the films.

As well as acting, Eden is also a keen golfer with a handicap of just 1. In a BBC Radio 5 interview he expressed an interest in playing golf professionally. He partnered Oliver Fisher at the 2008 Dunhill Links Championship, the European Tour's annual celebrity pro-am.

Filmography

References

External links

Official Flashbacks of A Fool UK Website

1990 births
English male child actors
English male film actors
English male television actors
Living people
People from Harlow
Alumni of the Sylvia Young Theatre School